Laurent Jacques Mendy (born 27 November 2001) is a Senegalese football midfielder.

Mendy made his Eliteserien debut in July 2021 against Vålerenga.

References

2001 births
Living people
Senegalese footballers
Sarpsborg 08 FF players
Strømmen IF players
Eliteserien players
Norwegian First Division players
Senegalese expatriate footballers
Expatriate footballers in Norway
Senegalese expatriate sportspeople in Norway
Association football midfielders